
This is a list of aircraft in alphabetical order beginning with 'Ta'.

Ta

Tachihi 
(New Tachikawa Aircraft Company Ltd (新立川飛行機株式会社 Shin Tachikawa Kōkūki Kabushiki Kaisha)
 Tachihi R-52
 Tachihi R-53
 Tachihi R-HM

Tachikawa 
(Tachikawa Aircraft Company Limited (立川飛行機株式会社, Tachikawa Kōkūki K.K.?))
 Tachikawa A-26
 Tachikawa KKY (Kogata Kei Kanja Yusoki - Small Type Patient Transport))
 Tachikawa KKY-2 (Kogata Kei Kanja Yusoki Kaizogata - Small Type Patient Transport Modified)
 Tachikawa KS (Kogata Sokuryoki - Small Survey Aircraft)
 Tachikawa R.5
 Tachikawa R.38
 Tachikawa SS-1
 Tachikawa T.S. 1
 Tachikawa-Beechcraft C17E Light Transport
 Tachikawa Ki-9
 Tachikawa Ki-17
 Tachikawa Ki-23
 Tachikawa Ki-25
 Tachikawa Ki-36
 Tachikawa Ki-54
 Tachikawa Ki-55
 Tachikawa Ki-70
 Tachikawa Ki-72
 Tachikawa Ki-74
 Tachikawa Ki-77
 Tachikawa Ki-94
 Tachikawa Ki-110
 Tachikawa Ki-111
 Tachikawa Ki-114
 Tachikawa Army Small and Light Ambulance Aircraft
 Tachikawa Army Type 95-1 Medium Grade Trainer Model A
 Tachikawa Army Type 95-3 Basic Grade Trainer Model A
 Tachikawa Army Type 98 Direct Co-operation Plane
 Tachikawa Army Type 99 Advanced Trainer
 Tachikawa Army Type 1 Advanced Trainer
 Tachikawa Army Type 1 Operations Trainer
 Tachikawa Army Type 1 Transport
 Tachikawa Army Type 1 Patrol Bomber
 Tachikawa-Lockheed Type-B high-altitude research aircraft

Taft 
((Philip E) Taft Airplane Corp, Elizabeth City, NC 1930: Acquired by Whittlesey Ltd.)
 Taft Kingfisher
 Taft X

Taggart 
(United States)
Taggart GyroBee

Ta-Ho-Ma 
(Ta-Ho-Ma Airplane & Motor Co (Pres: B H Vanderveld), 64 W Randolph St, Chicago, IL)
 Ta-Ho-Ma A
 Ta-Ho-Ma B

Task
(Task Research, Inc., Santa Paula, CA / Stanley K. Franks / Jim Kern)
 Franks-Task Silhouette)
 Task TR-60 Silhouette

TAI 
(Turkish Aerospace Industries)
 TAI ZIU (Zirai Ilaçlama Uçagi)
 TAI Hürkuş
 TAI/AgustaWestland T-129 ATAK
 TAI Hürjet

Taifun
(Taifun Flugzeugbau GmbH)
 Taifun Me 108F Taifun

Taina 
(Beau and Ryan Berkley, Paradise, CA)
 Taina Mid-Wing

Tairov 
(Designer: Vsevolod Konstantinovich Tairov)
 OKO-1
 OKO-4
 OKO-6
 OKO-6bis
 OKO-7
 Ta-1
 Ta-3
 Ta-3bis

Taiwan Dancer Aviation 
(Taiwan Dancer Technology Co., Ltd, Nan Gang Village, Da Yuan Township, Tao Yuan County, Taiwan)
Taiwan Dancer TD-1
Taiwan Dancer TD-2
Taiwan Dancer TD-3

Takasou 
(Takayuki Takasou)
 Takasou No.1 Aeroplane
 Takasou No.2 Aeroplane
 Takasou No.3 Aeroplane
 Takasou No.4 Aeroplane
 Takasou No.5 Aeroplane
 Takasou TN-6

Take Off GmbH
(Hamm, Germany)
Take Off Minimum
Take Off Maximum
Take Off Merlin

Tallmantz 
(Tallmantz Aviation Inc (merger: Paul Mantz, Frank Tallman), Orange Co Airport, Santa Ana, CA)
 Tallmantz P-1 Phoenix
 Tallmantz Ryan NYP replica

Talpade 
 Talpade's aircraft

Tamai 
(Seitaro Tamai & Terutaka Tamai)
 Tamai No.1 Seaplane
 Tamai 2 Nippon-go
 Tamai 3
 Tamai No.5
 Tamai No.24

Tampier 
(René Tampier)
 Tampier Avion automobile 
 Tampier T.4 
 Tampier T.6

Tandem Aircraft KG
(Saulgau, Germany)
Tandem Aircraft Sunny
Tandem Aircraft Sunny Sportster

Tangent 
(Tangent Aircraft)
 Tangent EMG-5

Tapanee 
(Tapanee Aviation, Inc)
 Tapanee Levitation 2
 Tapanee Levitation 4
 Tapanee Pegazair-100

Tarrant
(W.G Tarrant Ltd)
 Tarrant Tabor

Tarriaut
 Tarriaut T.1

TAT 
(Tunisia Aero Technologies)
 TAT Jbelassa
 TAT Super Nasnas
 TAT Nasnas
 TAT Aoussou
 TAT Jbelassa
 TAT Jbelassa
 TAT Jbelassa

Tatin 
(Victor Tatin)
 Tatin 1907 monoplane

Tatra 
(Ringhoffer-Tatra Works Ltd.)
 Tatra T.001
 Tatra T.101
 Tatra T.201
 Tatra T.301
 Tatra T.126
 Tatra T.131

Taubman 
( S Taubman Aircraft Co, 40 South Howard St, Akron, OH)
 Taubman LC-11 All-American
 Taubman LC-13

Taawney
 Tawney Owl

Taylor 
(John Taylor)
 Taylor J.T.1 Monoplane
 Taylor J.T.2 Titch

Taylor
(Fred taylor)
 Taylor A.101 Bedstead 
 Taylor B.102
 Taylor C.103 Wagtail
 Taylor D.104

Taylor 
((H B) Taylor Automobile Works, 1119 11th St, Las Vegas, NM)
 Taylor Thunderbird

Taylor 
(Truman F Taylor, Honolulu, HI)
 Territory of Taylor

Taylor 
(Thomas Taylor)
 Taylor 1

Taylor 
(Moulton B "Molt" Taylor, Chehalis and Longview, WA)
 Taylor Aerocar
 Taylor Aerocar II Aeroplane aka 1-A
 Taylor Aerocar III aka 1-C
 Taylor Bullet
 Taylor Coot A
 Taylor Coot B
 Taylor Sooper-Coot Model A
 Taylor IMP
 Taylor Micro-IMP
 Taylor Mini-IMP
 Taylor Ultra-IMP

Taylor 
(L A Taylor, Longview, TX)
 Taylor 1936 Monoplane

Taylor 
(Merton Taylor, Whitewater, WI)
 Taylor Tater Bug
 Taylor Topper

Taylor 
(Ralph Taylor)
 Taylor Rapid Transit

Taylor 
(Donald E Taylor, Evansville, IN)
 Taylor Tinker Toy

Taylor 
(Taylor Aero Industries, Westminster, CA)
 Taylor Bird

Taylor-Watkinson
(C.W. Taylor & E.T. Watkinson)
 Taylor-Watkinson DB.100 Dingbat

Taylor Brothers Aircraft Company 
( Taylor Bros Aircraft Co, Emery Field, Bradford, PA)
 North Star Loomis Special
 Taylor Special
 Arrowing A-2 Chummy originally just Chummy
 Taylor B-2 Chummy
 Taylor C-2 Chummy
 Taylor E-2 Cub
 Taylor F-2 Cub
 Taylor G-2 Cub
 Taylor H-2 Cub
 Taylor J-2 Cub
 Taylor J-2S Cub
 Taylor-Young Model A

Taylorcraft 
(Taylorcraft Aviation Corporation, Alliance, 27 D St, Bradford, PA)
 Taylorcraft C-95 Grasshopper
 Taylorcraft L-2 Grasshopper
 Taylorcraft LBT
 Taylorcraft LNT
 Taylorcraft O-57 Grasshopper
 Taylorcraft TG-6
 Taylorcraft A
 Taylorcraft B
 Taylorcraft BC Continental engine
 Taylorcraft BF Franklin engine
 Taylorcraft BL Lycoming engine
 Taylorcraft D
 Taylorcraft DC Continental engine
 Taylorcraft DF Franklin engine
 Taylorcraft DL Lycoming engine
 Taylorcraft 47
 Taylorcraft Ace
 Taylorcraft Foursome
 Taylorcraft Tourist
 Taylorcraft Traveler
 Taylorcraft De Luxe 65
 Taylorcraft De Luxe 85
 Taylorcraft Sportsman
 Taylorcraft Special De Luxe

Taylorcraft 
(Taylorcraft Aviation Corp (Charles & Dorothy Feris), Alliance, OH)
 Taylorcraft 15
 Taylorcraft 16
 Taylorcraft 18
 Taylorcraft F-19
 Taylorcraft 20 Ranch Wagon
 Taylorcraft 20 Ag Topper
 Taylorcraft 20 Zephyr 400
 Taylorcraft F-21
 Taylorcraft F-22
 Taylorcraft Ranch Wagon
 Taylorcraft Topper
 Taylorcraft Seabird

Taylorcraft Aeroplanes (England) Limited 
 Taylorcraft Plus C
 Taylorcraft Plus D
 Taylorcraft Auster I
 Taylorcraft Auster II
 Taylorcraft Auster III/Model E
 Taylorcraft Auster IV/Model G
 Taylorcraft Auster V/Model J

References

Further reading

External links 

 List of aircraft (T)